Hegetotheriidae is an extinct family of notoungulate mammals known from the Oligocene through the Pliocene of South America.

References

Typotheres
Oligocene mammals
Miocene mammals of South America
Pliocene mammals
Pliocene extinctions
Pliocene notoungulates
Prehistoric mammal families